Nick Samaras (born 1952) is a poet and essayist. His first book of poetry, Hands of the Saddlemaker received the Yale Series of Younger Poets Award.

Biography 
Samaras is the son of Bishop Kallistos Samaras, a prominent Greek Orthodox Clergyman and theologian. 
He was born in Foxton, Cambridgeshire, England, living there and on the island of Patmos, Greece. At the time of the political Greek junta military dictatorship, he was brought in exile to be raised further in America, via previous living in Turkey, Wales, Brussels, Switzerland, Italy, Austria, Germany, Yugoslavia, and Jerusalem. He later settled in Woburn, Massachusetts, his father's home town.

He earned his MFA from Columbia University, and his doctorate from the University of Denver. 
His individual poems have been featured in The New Yorker, The New York Times, The Paris Review, Poetry, The New Republic, Kenyon Review, and many other publications.
Currently, he lives in West Nyack, New York.

Works 
 Hands of the Saddlemaker New Haven : Yale University Press, 1992. , 
 American Psalm, World Psalm Ashland Poetry Press, 2014.

References

External links 
Image Artist of the Month – Nick Samaras
 A Conversation with poet, Nicholas Samaras, author of “American Psalm, World Psalm”, 24 July 2014

American male poets
American people of Greek descent
English emigrants to the United States
Year of birth missing (living people)
Living people
English people of Greek descent
Columbia University School of the Arts alumni
People from South Cambridgeshire District